Izon may refer to:

People
 Charles Izon (1872–1897), English football player
 David Izon, also known as David Izonritei, heavyweight silver medallist
 Dennis Izon (1907–1967), English football player
 Noel Izon, Filipino filmmaker

Places
 Izon, Gironde, France
 Izon-la-Bruisse, Drôme, France

Other
 Izon or Ijaw people
 Izon language
 Izon, fictional organisation in Cube 2: Hypercube
 Izon Science